Mohan Raghavan (22 January 1964 – 25 October 2011) was a Malayalam film director. He studied at the School of Drama, Thrissur, and in Theatre Arts at Madurai Kamaraj University.

Biography 
Raghavan is from Annamanada, Thrissur district. He undertook post-graduate studies in Theatre Arts from the Madurai Kamaraj University.

Filmography 

 2010 - T. D. Dasan Std. VI B - Director & Writer
 2008 - Kariyachan v/s Kariyachan (Tele film)
 2001 - Diary of a Housewife - Writer
 1994 - Kadal - Associate Director

Awards 
Awards won through T. D. Dasan Std. VI B (2010)
 Kerala State Film Award for Best Debut Director
 New York Indian Film Festival Award for Best Screenplay
 John Abraham Award for Best Film (Director)
 Kerala Film Critics Association Awards for Best Story
 Special Jury Award by World Malayali Council Awards
 INSPIRE Awards for Best Debutant Director
 Amrita-FEFKA Film Awards for Best Film (Director)
 Amrita-FEFKA Film Awards for Best Director
 Jaihind TV Film Awards for Best Screenplay (posthumous)

References

External links 

 Official website

People from Thrissur district
2011 deaths
Malayalam film directors
Madurai Kamaraj University alumni
1964 births
Screenwriters from Kerala
Film directors from Kerala
20th-century Indian film directors
21st-century Indian film directors